Malekabad (also Romanized as Malekābād) is a village in Parsinah Rural District, in the Central District of Sonqor County, Kermanshah Province, Iran. At the 2006 census, its population was 50, in 9 families.

References 

Populated places in Sonqor County